Southern Pacific 4460 is the only surviving class "GS-6" steam locomotive, together with "GS-4" class Southern Pacific 4449, which is operational in excursion service. The GS-6 is a semi-streamlined 4-8-4 "Northern" type steam locomotive. GS stands for "Golden State" or "General Service." The locomotive was built by the Lima Locomotive Works (LLW) for the Southern Pacific Railroad (SP) in 1943. The GS-6 lacked side skirting and red and orange "Daylight" paint found on previous locomotives of the GS class and were painted black and silver instead. The War Production Board controlled locomotive manufacturers during World War II and had turned down Southern Pacific's order of fourteen new Daylight locomotives in 1942. Southern Pacific re-designed the new fleet based on the older GS-2s, only with 260 psi instead of 250 psi, an all-weather cab, and a new GS-4 style tender. The design was finally approved, but the War Production Board reassigned four to the smaller and power-starved Western Pacific Railroad (only the tender from Western Pacific GS6/64 #484 remains). Their smaller size when compared to previous GS class locomotives and the fact that they were built during World War II earned them the nicknames "War Babies."

Revenue service years 
SP 4460 was built in July 1943 and was used during World War II. The engine was the first GS-6 ever manufactured and is famous for pulling the last steam-powered passenger train and being the last operational steam locomotive on the Southern Pacific Railroad in October 1958. That final run was from Sacramento, California to Sparks, Nevada, and return, with no diesel assistance except for when 4460 developed a hot bearing. A local Boy Scout Bugler from the Bay Area Council, played taps for the funeral of the 4460, staged by the Southern Pacific Railroad.

Preservation 
Following the final excursion, SP 4460 was donated to the National Museum of Transportation in St. Louis, Missouri, on April 16, 1959, where the engine has since sat along with many other historic steam and diesel locomotives from around the country. Besides having the nicknames "Black Daylight" and "War Baby", she is also known as the "Forgotten Daylight" as she has not seen the fame sister locomotive SP 4449 has had when that engine was restored to operating condition. A full restoration to the operation of 4460 is unlikely to happen in the near future.

References

External links 
 Museum of Transportation
 Friends of SP 4449

4460
Individual locomotives of the United States
4-8-4 locomotives
Lima locomotives
Railway locomotives introduced in 1943
Standard gauge locomotives of the United States
Preserved steam locomotives of Missouri